"High Rollin'" is a song written by Dave Gibson and Blue Miller, and recorded by American country music group Gibson/Miller Band.  It was released in February 1993 as the second single from the album Where There's Smoke....  The song reached number 20 on the Billboard Hot Country Singles & Tracks chart.

Chart performance

References

1993 singles
1993 songs
Gibson/Miller Band songs
Epic Records singles
Song recordings produced by Doug Johnson (record producer)
Songs written by Dave Gibson (American songwriter)